Santillán or Santillan is a Spanish surname. Notable people with the surname include:

Akira Santillan, tennis player
Daniel Justin Santillan, artist
Diego Abad de Santillán (1897–1983), author, economist, leading figure in the Spanish and Argentine anarchist movements
Jesica Santillan (1985–2003), illegal immigrant from Mexico who died after an organ transplant operation in the U.S.
Julian Hernández Santillán, Mexican politician from Nuevo León affiliated to the National Action Party (PAN)
Manuel Santillán (1894–1982), Mexican geological engineer and politician
Maria Teresa Santillan, former mayor of Lynwood, California
Mario Santillan, Paralympian athlete from Mexico
Nicandra Díaz-Santillán, an undocumented Mexican immigrant who emerged as a national face of immigrant labor rights when she revealed her status during the 2010 California gubernatorial election
Pedro Velarde y Santillán (1779–1808), Spanish artillery captain famous for his heroic death
Pura Santillan-Castrence (1905–2007), Filipino writer and diplomat
Ramón de Santillán, (1791–1863), Spanish soldier, politician, and minister of finance
Tony Santillan, American baseball player

See also
Huétor Santillán, municipality located in the province of Granada, Spain
Tasa de Santillán or Rate of Santillán, a rate of indigenous labor applied in the Kingdom of Chile
Santillana (disambiguation)

Spanish-language surnames